McClearn is a surname. Notable people with the surname include:

 Gerald E. McClearn (1927–2017), American behavior geneticist
 Jimmy McClearn, Irish politician
 Matthew McClearn (1802–1865), Nova Scotia merchant, ship owner, and politician

See also
 McClean
 McCleary